The Treaty of Badajoz may refer to these accords signed in Badajoz, Spain:

Treaty of Badajoz (1267)
Treaty of Badajoz (1801)